Juan Alonso Pérez de Guzmán y de Guzmán-Zúñiga, 6th Duke of Medina Sidonia (24 March 1502 – 26 November 1558) was the son of Juan Alfonso Pérez de Guzmán, 3rd Duke of Medina Sidonia, half brother of Enrique Pérez de Guzmán, 4th Duke of Medina Sidonia, and the brother of Alfonso Pérez de Guzmán, 5th Duke of Medina Sidonia.  Upon his brother's death in 1549, he became Duke of Medina Sidonia.

In 1518 he married his brother's wife, Ana de Aragón (d. 1528), daughter of Alonso de Aragón, and had issue:
 Juan Carlos de Guzmán y Aragón (d. 1556), married Leonor de Zúñiga y Sotomayor and had a son, Alonso Pérez de Guzmán, 7th Duke of Medina Sidonia
 Ana Pérez de Guzmán y Aragón, married Íñigo Fernández de Velasco, 4th Duke of Frías, with issue
 Leonor Ana de Guzmán y Aragón (c. 1540 – 23 November 1573), married Pedro Téllez-Girón, 1st Duke of Osuna, with issue

As Don Juan Carlos predeceased his father in 1556, the title passed to his eldest son Alonso Pérez de Guzmán, 7th Duke of Medina Sidonia.

1502 births
1559 deaths
106